Broomhill railway station served the village of Broomhill in Northumberland, England, a former pit village.

The line through the station site was opened in September 1849 by the York, Newcastle, and Berwick Railway Company (YN&BR) to carry coal from the local collieries to Amble's Warkworth Harbour, the station itself was opened on 2 June 1879 by which time the YN&BR had become part of the North Eastern Railway.

The station was located in a shallow cutting on the east side of what is now Station Road, opposite the Broomhill Hotel (now The Trap Inn), there was one platform on the north side of a single track, immediately to the east of the station was a passing loop which itself had a small goods yard and shed to its north, the yard was equipped with a 1½ ton crane. To the south of the station were extensive sidings serving Broomhill Colliery and its associated brickworks and gas works.

In the winter of 1912/1913 the station had four weekday services in each direction with an extra three or four services on Saturdays, there were no services on Sundays.

The passenger service closed on 7 July 1930, with the last train two days before on 5 July, and the goods service closed 34 years later on 4 May 1964 although by this time it had been reduced to a public delivery siding. The station had 27,746 passengers in 1911.

References

Bibliography

Further reading 
 
 

Railway stations in Northumberland
Former North Eastern Railway (UK) stations
Railway stations in Great Britain opened in 1879
1879 establishments in England
1930 disestablishments in England